Annie Robe (1866–1922) was an English-born American stage actress prominent in the final decades of the Victorian Era, the 1880s and 1890s.

Robe's father was a scenic artist, and her mother was English actress Eliza Rugg. Robe began acting when she was 11 years old. Lester Wallack discovered her on a visit to England and brought her to the United States to act with his company.

She was distantly related, through marriage, to Ethel Barrymore, whose husband Russell Griswold Colt was a relative of Robe's husband Daniel Paine Griswold.

Robe died a widow at Pittsfield, Massachusetts on July 26, 1922.

References

External links

1866 births
1922 deaths
Actresses from London
19th-century American actresses
American stage actresses
19th-century English women
19th-century English people